The Young Egypt Party (Misr El-Fatah) also known as the Green Shirts was an Egyptian nationalist political party. It is notable for counting a young Gamal Abdel Nasser and Anwar Sadat as members.

History

The party was formed 12 October 1933 as a nationalist party with "religious elements" by its leader Ahmed Hussein. Its aim was to encourage Union consisting of Egypt and Sudan—that would ally with other Arab and Muslim countries It derives its name from the Young Italy party, which appeared in Italy at the end of the nineteenth century, and contributed to the unification of that country. It is stated that the very high popularity of the party was the inspiration for the emergence of movements like Green Shirts which was different as opinions think it was a militaristic organization as its young members were organized in a paramilitary movement. This excerpt is from the first issue of Al Sarkha (Arabic: The loud call), the official magazine of the Young Egypt Association, issued on 30 December 1933.

"We live in chaos, so we must live in order, by gather young people on one level, & accustom them to order and obedience, to dress them in one uniform, and to make for them one slogan and a specific goal, and to set an example for them that they are trying to reach, and to fill them with faith in their right. And out of faith in their strength and ability to work, and to force them to austerity, to have some amusement, effeminacy, and defilement, to worship God, to perish for the sake of the homeland, and to gather around the throne of the king.”

Another possible reason is around the same time many other organizations like Muslim brotherhood established, also as some of its member openly admired the achievements Germany in world wars the enemy of Egypt's occupier, the British Empire. but it was only an anti-British tone increase.

During its heyday in the 1930s Young Egypt's "Green Shirts" had some violent confrontations with the Wafd Party's "Blue Shirts". One member even tried to assassinate Mustafa el-Nahas Pasha in November 1937. Under government pressure, the Green Shirts were disbanded in 1938. The group was renamed the Nationalist Islamic Party in 1940, when it took on a more religious, as well as anti-British tone. After the war it was renamed yet again, now the Socialist Party of Egypt. The group's one electoral success came when it sent Ibrahim Shukri, its vice-president, to parliament in 1951. However it was disbanded, along with all other parties, in 1953 following the 1952 revolution

After political parties were allowed again in Egypt, Ibrahim Shoukry formed a group, the Socialist Labor Party in 1978, which despite its name look much like the social nationalistic ideology of Young Egypt. It consists of members from different economic and social levels.

References

Further reading 
 Political Parties of the Middle East and North Africa Ed. Frank Tachau; Greenwood Press: Westport Connecticut, 1994

Banned political parties in Egypt
Banned far-right parties
Defunct political parties in Egypt
Egyptian nationalist parties
Far-right politics in Africa
Fascist parties
Fascism in the Arab world
Political parties established in 1933
Political parties disestablished in 1953
1933 establishments in Egypt
1953 disestablishments in Egypt